Nicolae Rotaru (born 16 July 1935) is a retired Romanian sport shooter. He competed in small-bore rifle, prone and three positions, at the 1960, 1964, 1968, 1972 and 1976 Olympics and won a bronze medal in 1972 in the prone event. In 1980 he immigrated to the United States.

References

1935 births
Living people
Romanian male sport shooters
ISSF rifle shooters
Olympic shooters of Romania
Shooters at the 1960 Summer Olympics
Shooters at the 1964 Summer Olympics
Shooters at the 1968 Summer Olympics
Shooters at the 1972 Summer Olympics
Shooters at the 1976 Summer Olympics
Olympic bronze medalists for Romania
Olympic medalists in shooting
Medalists at the 1972 Summer Olympics